The  is the 15th edition of the Japan Film Professional Awards. It awarded the best of 2005 in film. The ceremony did not take place in this year.

Awards 
Best Film: Itsuka dokusho suruhi
Best Director: Nobuhiro Yamashita (Linda Linda Linda)
Best Actress: Yūko Tanaka (Itsuka dokusho suruhi, Hibi)
Best Actress: Kyōko Koizumi (Hanging Garden)
Best Actor: Joe Odagiri (House of Himiko, Scrap Heaven)
Best Actor: Hidetoshi Nishijima (Kikyō, Sayonara Midori-chan, Ame Yori Setsunaku)
Best New Director: Tatsushi Ōmori (The Whispering of the Gods)
Best New Director: Kenji Uchida (A Stranger of Mine)

10 best films
 Itsuka dokusho suruhi (Akira Ogata)
 Linda Linda Linda (Nobuhiro Yamashita)
 Break Through! (Kazuyuki Izutsu)
 Hanging Garden (Toshiaki Toyoda)
 A Stranger of Mine (Kenji Uchida)
 Curtain call (Kiyoshi Sasabe)
 The Whispering of the Gods (Tatsushi Ōmori)
 Lakeside Murder Case (Shinji Aoyama)
 House of Himiko (Isshin Inudo)
 Kanaria (Akihiko Shiota)

References

External links
  

Japan Film Professional Awards
2006 in Japanese cinema
Japan Film Professional Awards